Frederick Wortendyke House may refer to:

Frederick Wortendyke House (Park Ridge, New Jersey), listed on the National Register of Historic Places in Bergen County, New Jersey
Frederick Wortendyke House (Woodcliff Lake, New Jersey), listed on the National Register of Historic Places in Bergen County, New Jersey